In vector calculus, an invex function is a differentiable function  from  to  for which there exists a vector valued function  such that

for all x and u.

Invex functions were introduced by Hanson as a generalization of convex functions.  Ben-Israel and Mond provided a simple proof that a function is invex if and only if every stationary point is a global minimum, a theorem first stated by Craven and Glover.

Hanson also showed that if the objective and the constraints of an optimization problem are invex with respect to the same function , then the Karush–Kuhn–Tucker conditions are sufficient for a global minimum.

Type I invex functions 
A slight generalization of invex functions called Type I invex functions are the most general class of functions for which the Karush–Kuhn–Tucker conditions are necessary and sufficient for a global minimum. Consider a mathematical program of the form

where  and are differentiable functions. Let denote the feasible region of this program. The function  is a Type I objective function and the function  is a Type I constraint function at with respect to  if there exists a vector-valued function  defined on  such that 

and

for all . Note that, unlike invexity, Type I invexity is defined relative to a point .

See also
 Convex function
 Pseudoconvex function
 Quasiconvex function

References

Further reading

 S. K. Mishra and G. Giorgi, Invexity and optimization, Nonconvex Optimization and Its Applications, Vol. 88, Springer-Verlag, Berlin, 2008.
 S. K. Mishra, S.-Y. Wang and K. K. Lai, Generalized Convexity and Vector Optimization, Springer, New York, 2009.

Convex analysis
Generalized convexity
Real analysis
Types of functions